Thattai (Tamil - தட்டை) is a south Indian deep fried snack made with rice flour and commonly prepared during Janmashtami or Sri Krishna Jayanthi festival. This preparation has salted and sweet versions. It is known as Nippattu in Karnataka and Chekkalu in Andhra Pradesh/Telangana

Ingredients 
The typical ingredients are rice flour, urad daal, peanuts, fried gram, chana daal and other seasoning which are mixed in their respective proportions and deep fried in oil. It is available in various flavors like Butter, Ginger and Masala. Salem in Tamil Nadu is known for its 'Thattuvadai sets' which is made using the Thattai (like a bread in a sandwich) and stuffed with various vegetables like Beetroot, Carrot, Chutney and oils.

References

 Traditional Cuisine of Tamil Brahmins in Kerala. 

Indian cuisine
Appetizers